The 1915 All-Western college football team consists of American football players selected to the All-Western teams chosen by various selectors for the 1915 college football season.

All-Western selections

Ends
 Bert Baston, Minnesota (Ax-1; ECP-1; S; WE-1) (CFHOF)
 Guy Chamberlin, Nebraska (Ax-1; ECP-2, FM-1; S; WE-1) (CFHOF/PFHOF)
 George K. Squier, Illinois (Ax-2; ECP-1, DJ, FM-1)
 Albert J. Quist, Minnesota (Ax-2; ECP-2)
 Blake Miller, Michigan State (DJ)

Tackles
 Cub Buck, Wisconsin (Ax-1; ECP-1, DJ [as guard], FM-1; S; WE-1)
 Laurens Shull, Chicago (Ax-1; ECP-2, DJ, FM-1; WE-1)
 Elmer T. Rundquist, Illinois (ECP-1)
 Manley R. Petty, Illinois (ECP-2)
 Vic Halligan, Nebraska (DJ)
 Gideon Smith, Michigan Agricultural (S)
 Ivan B. Boughton, Ohio State (Ax-2)
 Robert H. Randolph, Northwestern (Ax-2)

Guards
 Merton Arthur Dunnigan, Minnesota (Ax-1; ECP-1, FM-1; WE-1)
 Freeman Fitzgerald, Notre Dame (Ax-2; FM-1; S; WE-1)
 Frank Blocker, Purdue (Ax-1; ECP-1)
 Fred R. Hanschmann, Illinois (ECP-2)
 Gilbert S. Sinclair, Minnesota (ECP-2)
 William D. Cochran, Michigan (DJ)
 Earl Abbott, Nebraska (Ax-2; S)

Centers
 John W. Watson, Illinois (Ax-1; ECP-1, DJ, FM-1; S; WE-1)
 H. F. Hanson, Minnesota (ECP-2, FM-2)
 Lyman Frimodig, Michigan Agr. (FM-3)
 Fisher, Chicago (Ax-2)

Quarterbacks
 Pete Russell, Chicago (Ax-1; ECP-1, DJ [as hb], FM-1; S; WE-1)
 George Clark, Illinois (ECP-2, DJ, FM-2)
 C. I. "Shorty" Long, Minnesota (FM-3)
 Frank B. Whitaker, Indiana (Ax-2)

Halfbacks
 Bart Macomber, Illinois (Ax-2; ECP-1; FM-3; S; WE-1) (CFHOF)
 John Maulbetsch, Michigan (Ax-2; ECP-1, FM-3 [as fb]; S; WE-1) (CFHOF)
  Richard B. Rutherford, Nebraska (Ax-1; FM-1)
 Neno DaPrato, Michigan Agr. (FM-1)
 Paddy Driscoll, Northwestern (Ax-1)
 Eber Simpson, Wisconsin (ECP-2)
 Dow Byers, Wisconsin (ECP-2, FM-2)
 Stan Cofall, Notre Dame (FM-2)
 Harold A. Winters, Ohio State (FM-3)

Fullbacks
 Bernie Bierman, Minnesota (Ax-1; ECP-1, DJ [as hb], FM-1; S; WE-1) (CFHOF)
 Pudge Wyman, Minnesota (ECP-2)
 Harold Pogue, Illinois (DJ)
 Charlie Bachman, Notre Dame (Ax-2) (CFHOF)

Key
Bold = consensus choice by a majority of the selectors

Ax = G. W. Axelson of the Chicago Herald

ECP = E. C. Patterson in Collier's Weekly

DJ = Dick Jemison in the Atlanta Constitution.

FM = Frank G. Menke of the International News Service

S = Sullivan in The News of Chicago

WE = Walter Eckersall of the Chicago Tribune

CFHOF = College Football Hall of Fame

Bold = Consensus first-team selection by at least three of the selectors listed

See also
1915 College Football All-America Team

References

1915 Western Conference football season
All-Western college football teams